LatBus is the public transportation bus system that serves Murcia, Spain, and surrounding communities.

References

External links

Bus transport in Spain
Transport in the Region of Murcia